Orocrambus heliotes is a moth in the family Crambidae. It was described by Edward Meyrick in 1888. This species is endemic to New Zealand.  O. heliotes has been recorded in the South Island and the North Island. The habitat it prefers consists of swampy tussock grasslands and margins of slow-moving streams.

The wingspan is 14–17 mm for males and 15–20 mm for females. Adults have been recorded from early November to early February.

The larvae feed on Sphagnum, Funaria and Breutelia species, as well as Juncus bufonius.

References

Crambinae
Moths described in 1888
Moths of New Zealand
Endemic fauna of New Zealand
Taxa named by Edward Meyrick
Endemic moths of New Zealand